Monty Lewis (born January 2, 1963) is an American football coach.  Is the head football coach at Winfield High School in Winfield, KS.  Lewis served as the head football coach at Southwestern College in Winfield, Kansas from 1993 to 2001 and Friends University in Wichita, Kansas from 2003 to 2016.

Playing career
Lewis played college football at Southwestern College, where he was an National Association of Intercollegiate Athletics (NA) All-American in 1983 and 1984.  He played for head coaches Dennis Franchione and Charlie Cowdrey and participated in Southwestern's the 1982 Sunflower Bowl victory.

Coaching career
Lewis was the head football coach at the Southwestern College and led the team to a record of 60–32 during his tenure, including a 1996 Wheat Bowl victory against , to become the all-time winningest coach in school history.

In 2008, Lewis won his 100th game as a head coach at the college level.  Lewis was abruptly fired from Friends in March 2017.  For the 2017 season, he took a job coaching quarterbacks at Maize South High School, remaining in Wichita while his son played his senior season at Friends.

Head coaching record

College

References

1963 births
Living people
Colorado State Rams football coaches
Fort Hays State Tigers football coaches
Friends Falcons football coaches
Kentucky Wildcats football coaches
MacMurray Highlanders football coaches
Northeastern State RiverHawks football coaches
Southwestern Moundbuilders football coaches
Southwestern Moundbuilders football players
West Texas A&M Buffaloes football coaches
High school football coaches in Kansas
High school football coaches in Oklahoma
People from Greeley, Colorado